"The Crawling Chaos" is a short story by American writers H. P. Lovecraft and Winifred V. Jackson, first published April 1921 in the United Cooperative. As in their other collaboration, "The Green Meadow", the tale was credited to "Elizabeth Berkeley" (Jackson) and "Lewis Theobald, Jun" (Lovecraft). Lovecraft wrote the entire text, but Jackson is also credited since the story was based on a dream she experienced.

Despite the title's similarity to the character's epithet, Lovecraft's monster Nyarlathotep does not appear in this story.

Plot
The story begins with the narrator describing the effects of opium and the fantastical vistas it can inspire. The narrator then tells of his sole experience with opium in which he was accidentally administered an overdose by a doctor during the "year of the plague".

After a disembodied sensation of falling, the narrator finds himself within a strange beautiful room containing exotic furniture, where a pounding sound from outside inspires an inexplicable sense of dread within the narrator. Determined to identify the origin of this sound, the narrator moves towards a window and observes a terrifying scene of fifty-foot waves and seething vortex consuming the shoreline at an incredible rate. 

Sensing imminent danger, the narrator quickly exits the building. Fleeing the waves, the narrator travels inland. The narrator eventually arrives in a valley with tropical grass extending above his head and a great palm tree in the center. Driven by curiosity despite his fear, the narrator crawls on his hands and knees toward the great palm. 

Soon after arriving at the tree, the narrator observes an angelic child fall from its branches. The child then smiles and extends its hand towards the narrator and the narrator hears ethereal singing within the upper air followed by the child saying in an otherworldly voice:

As the child speaks, the narrator observes two youths emerging from the leaves of the tree. They take the narrator by the hand and describe the worlds of "Teloe" and "Cytharion of the Seven Suns" which lie beyond the Milky Way. 

As they speak, the narrator observes that he is floating in the upper atmosphere, with the palm tree far below, and now accompanied by an ever increasing number of singing, vine-crowned youths. As they ascend, the child tells the narrator that he must always look upward and never down at the earth below.

As he rises further listening to the youths singing, the narrator is disturbed by the return of the sound of the waves, and, forgetting what the child said, looks downward and observes a sight of global destruction, with the waves consuming the cities until there is nothing left. This is followed by the waters draining into the Earth's core via an opening gulf, which causes the Earth to explode.

Reprints
The tale was published in Beyond the Wall of Sleep. The corrected text is collected in Lovecraft's revisions volume The Horror in the Museum and Other Revisions (Arkham House, 1970).

References

External links

 Publication History
 

1921 short stories
Apocalyptic fiction
Fantasy short stories
Horror short stories
Short stories about dreams
Short stories by H. P. Lovecraft
Works about opium
Works originally published in American magazines
Works published under a pseudonym